Saint-Étienne-de-Saint-Geoirs (literally 'Saint-Étienne of Saint-Geoirs') is a commune in the Isère department in southeastern France. It is the hometown of Rose Valland, who saved thousands of works of art from Nazi looting and destruction during World War II and thwarted German efforts to remove art by passing information to the French Resistance. The organization Memoire de Rose Valland is based in Saint-Étienne-de-Saint-Geoirs.

Singer (bass) and actor Xavier Depraz died in Saint-Étienne-de-Saint-Geoirs on 18 October 1994.

Population

Twin towns
Saint-Étienne-de-Saint-Geoirs is twinned with:

  Casorate Sempione, Italy, since 2013

See also
 Communes of the Isère department
 Grenoble-Isère Airport

References

Communes of Isère
Isère communes articles needing translation from French Wikipedia